Bubbleworks (originally named Prof. Burp's Bubble Works, then Imperial Leather Bubbleworks from 2006) was a dark water ride opened in 1990 at Chessington World of Adventures Resort in Greater London, England. It took riders through animated scenes of a comical factory producing fizzy pop. The original ride closed, to be redesigned in 2006 with a sponsorship by Imperial Leather toiletries, with the majority of the animations removed. The new Bubbleworks then closed in September 2016 to be replaced by The Gruffalo River Ride Adventure.

History

Prof. Burp's Bubble Works

The ride was created as part of the second phase to regenerate Chessington Zoo into a popular theme park. The Transylvania area in Chessington World of Adventures was created in 1990, opening with the Vampire and Prof. Burp's Bubble Works as its main attractions.

Park developer John Wardley developed the concept of a magical factory following the making of Professor Burp's fizzy pop from juicing to bottling. Keith Sparks' production company designed and built the attraction. The musical soundtrack was produced by composer Graham Smart.

The dark ride went on to be highly successful for the park. It spawned similar water dark rides in the country. John Wardley has stated it was often named third best dark ride in the world by the National Amusement Park Historical Association. John Wardley later reflected on the attraction as being his "proudest moment at Chessington".

Riders had the option to exit into a gift shop, originally selling Bubble Works souvenirs including Professor Burp-branded drinks. In later years, the ride's exit path was permanently routed through the gift shop.

2006 Refurbishment

Prof. Burp's BubbleWorks operated for fifteen years, before being replaced a new sponsored version by Tussauds Studios at the end of 2005, without the involvement of the ride's original design team. The ride's theme was changed to a soap factory to suit sponsor Imperial Leather. Several of the sets and props were recycled, extensively modified and repainted by Tussauds. Additionally, almost all the animations were removed or made static.

Upon re-opening, the redesigned attraction received highly negative response for having removed the animations and humour of the ride and for the flawed alterations to its soundtrack, lighting and animations (including dubbing over most of the original theme music with quacking duck sounds). It was noted that the new Bubbleworks was largely a "monotonous... charmless and, at best, highly irritating" advert for its sponsor.

The original ride's producer John Wardley refused to ride the new version, having been warned that he "would weep if [he] did", emphasising that he disowned the new version.

In 2014 the Imperial Leather brand logos were removed or covered up, although the ride remained unchanged otherwise. On 21 December 2013, a fire broke out at the adjacent Creaky Cafe building, which damaged an exterior wall to the finale room, requiring repairs. During this time the ride's facade was repainted in blue.

Closure
In the summer of 2016, Chessington announced that the ride was set to close in September that year to be replaced by a new dark ride. The replacement was developed by Merlin Magic Making (previously Tussauds Studios).

Chessington subsequently announced that a ride based on the Gruffalo franchise would open in 2017; a decision that was met with highly mixed reaction on social media.

Throughout the closing down period, Chessington conflated the much-changed 2006 ride with the 1990 Professor Burp's version (which had received its own closing down event 10 years earlier), and instructed their press coverage to do so. It was erroneously claimed that Prof. Burp's BubbleWorks had been operating for 26 years. The park were criticised for capitalising on the reputation of the since-closed original. John Wardley declined to attend the closing down event in 2016. The Bubbleworks finally closed on 6 September, with many of its remaining props sold at auction.

Throughout the ride's final month, Chessington offered separately-priced 'VIP Behind The Scenes' tours to the public. Led by an actor in a Professor Burp imitation costume and wig, the tours purportedly contained factual inaccuracies about the original ride, including stating that the Bubblehead characters were named 'Willyheads'. This was also displayed on notice boards during the ride's closing-down media party.

References

External links

2006 establishments in England
2016 disestablishments in England
Former buildings and structures in the Royal Borough of Kingston upon Thames
Chessington World of Adventures past rides
Water rides manufactured by Mack Rides
Rides designed by John Wardley
Cultural infrastructure completed in 1990
Amusement rides introduced in 2006
Amusement rides that closed in 2016